Pontypridd Cottage Hospital is a health facility on Hospital Road, in Pontypridd, Rhondda Cynon Taf, Wales. It is managed by the Cwm Taf Morgannwg University Health Board.

History
The facility was financed by subscriptions from local miners and opened as Pontypridd & District Cottage Hospital in February 1911. It joined the National Health Service in 1948. In 2017, it was announced that all cancer services for the county, which had previously been provided at the hospital, would transfer to new facilities at the Royal Glamorgan Hospital. The local health board has announced plans to sell the hospital.

References

Hospitals in Rhondda Cynon Taf
Hospitals established in 1911
1911 establishments in Wales
Hospital buildings completed in 1911
Buildings and structures in Rhondda Cynon Taf
NHS hospitals in Wales
Pontypridd
Cwm Taf Morgannwg University Health Board